In Greek mythology, King Gelanor of Argos, was the son and successor of Sthenelus. His real name was possibly Pelasgus, as Robert Graves has proposed that the name "Gelanor" is a literary device meaning 'laughter': he was so called because he had initially laughed at the claim to kingship over Argos by Danaus.

Mythology 
Gelanor welcomed Danaus and his daughters when they tried to escape Aegyptus and his sons. When an oracle told Gelanor to give Danaus his kingdom, he did so. He wanted to sell the Danaïdes into slavery following their murder of their husbands, but Danaus and the gods dissuaded him. He is simply called the "king" in Aeschylus's Suppliant Maidens. Alternatively, it was not an oracle, but an omen, that induced Gelanor to renounce his kinship in favor of Danaus. The omen was of a wolf attacking a herd of cattle grazing beside the city-wall, and killing the leading bull.

In Helen of Troy, a novel by Margaret George, Gelanor is a fictional character who acts as an advisor to the Spartans under Menelaus. He accompanies Helen when she goes to Troy.

Notes

References 

 Graves, Robert, The Greek Myths, Harmondsworth, London, England, Penguin Books, 1960. 
 Graves, Robert, The Greek Myths: The Complete and Definitive Edition. Penguin Books Limited. 2017. 
 Grimal, Pierre, The Dictionary of Classical Mythology, Wiley-Blackwell, 1996. 

Princes in Greek mythology
Kings of Argos
Kings in Greek mythology
Inachids